Stand High Patrol are a sound system based in Brittany, France, who take influence from the traditional Jamaican sound system tradition, and from Reggae and dub musicians, and more recently from Hip Hop music . They are made up of Pupajim (MC/vocals), Mac Gyver (operator), Rootystep (selector) and Merry (trumpet). Founded in 2000, Stand High Patrol have gone on to create three full length albums, and have made collaborations with various artists, and have performed to sell-out venues worldwide. With the release of their album The Shift in May 2017, Stand High Patrol have begun to explore a genre combining Hip-Hop with their roots in Dub and Reggae.

Stand High Records
In 2009, they created their own label Stand High Records. In 2012, following the release of several EPs and singles, they released their first album : Midnight Walkers. They returned in 2015 with their second album : A Matter of Scale, featuring their trumpeter Merry. In early 2017, Stand High Records released the debut album of the dubstep artist Stepart, entitled Playground. On May 26, 2017, they released Stand High Patrol's third album: The Shift.

Discography

Albums

EPs and singles

References

French hip hop musicians
French reggae musicians